Ingrid Schmid-Gfölner (born 13 September 1952) is an Austrian former alpine skier.

External links
 http://data.fis-ski.com/dynamic/athlete-biography.html?sector=AL&listid=&competitorid=20072
 http://data.fis-ski.com/dynamic/athlete-biography.html?sector=AL&listid=&competitorid=54607

References

1952 births
Living people
Austrian female alpine skiers
20th-century Austrian women
21st-century Austrian women